Fernando Pacheco Flores (born 18 May 1992) is a Spanish professional footballer who plays as a goalkeeper for RCD Espanyol.

Formed at Real Madrid, where he played only two Copa del Rey games for the first team, he spent most of his career at Alavés after signing in 2015, making 253 appearances.

Club career

Real Madrid
Born in Badajoz, Extremadura, Pacheco played for two local clubs before joining Real Madrid in 2006, aged 14. He made his senior debut on 28 August 2011 with the C team, playing in the Tercera División against CF Rayo Majadahonda.

Pacheco appeared in his first game with the main squad on 20 December 2011, coming on as a late substitute for fellow youth graduate Antonio Adán in a 5–1 home victory over SD Ponferradina in the round of 32 of the Copa del Rey. In 2012–13, he alternated between starting duties in the third side and the occasional callup to the second, making his debut in the Segunda División on 2 June 2013 in a 4–0 home win against AD Alcorcón. He kept his position the following match – the final in the second-tier campaign – at Girona FC.

Pacheco made his first start for the first team on 2 December 2014, in a 5–0 rout of UE Cornellà in the domestic cup where he featured the full 90 minutes. Later that month, he was the unused third-choice goalkeeper as the Blancos won the FIFA Club World Cup in Morocco.

Alavés
On 7 August 2015, Pacheco signed a three-year deal with Deportivo Alavés of division two, with Real Madrid having a buy-back clause. He made his debut for the club on 22 August, starting in a 3–2 away win against SD Huesca.

Pacheco was an undisputed starter for the Basques in his first season. He appeared in 40 league matches – missing one due to injury and being a substitute for Pau Torres in the last matchday – as they achieved promotion back to La Liga after ten years, as champions.

Pacheco's maiden appearance in the Spanish top flight occurred on 21 August 2016, in a 1–1 away draw with Atlético Madrid. He only missed two games in 38 during the campaign, and his team finished comfortably in mid-table; in February he extended his contract to 2020.

Pacheco was ever-present in 2017–18, receiving the highest total marks for the season from the local newspaper El Correo. In December of the next season, his link was lengthened to 2023.

On 13 June 2020, Pacheco was sent off for handling the ball outside the penalty area in the 19th minute of a 2–0 loss at bottom-placed RCD Espanyol. He played every fixture again the following campaign, a narrow escape from relegation.

During his spell at the Mendizorrotza Stadium, Pacheco totalled 253 appearances.

Almería
On 10 August 2022, Pacheco signed a four-year contract with UD Almería in the top tier. Thinking he would start due to his experience in the competition, he was however unable to beat competition from Fernando Martínez, and asked to leave in the following transfer window.

Espanyol
On 31 January 2023, Pacheco joined RCD Espanyol on a three-and-a-half-year deal.

Career statistics

Club

Honours
Real Madrid
FIFA Club World Cup: 2014

Alavés
Segunda División: 2015–16

References

External links

1992 births
Living people
Sportspeople from Badajoz
Spanish footballers
Footballers from Extremadura
Association football goalkeepers
La Liga players
Segunda División players
Segunda División B players
Tercera División players
Real Madrid C footballers
Real Madrid Castilla footballers
Real Madrid CF players
Deportivo Alavés players
UD Almería players
RCD Espanyol footballers
Spain youth international footballers
Spain under-21 international footballers